Paramytha Lestari Mulyarto (born June 29, 1991) is an Indonesian pop singer notable for winning the first season of the reality television Mamamia Show.

Biography
Paramytha Lestari Mulyarto was born in Biak, Papua. She is the eldest of three children. Mytha attended SMA Taruna Andiga.

List of Songs
Mamamia Goes 2 : Sinaran (Sheila Majid)
Show 1 : Bahasa Kalbu (Titi Dj)
Show 2 : Berharap Tak Berpisah (Reza)
Show 3 : Cinta Kita (Reza)
Show 4 : Pupus (Dewa 19) EXTRA APPEARANCE
Show 5 : Inikah Cinta (ME)
Show 6 : Aku Ini Punya Siapa (January Christy)
Show 7 : Bintang Bintang (Titi Dj) EXTRA APPEARANCE
Show 8 : Ku Tak Bisa (SLANK) CRITICAL ZONE
Show 9 : Jemu (Koesplus) & Tak Kan Terganti (Yovie Widianto) EXTRA APPEARANCE
Show 10 : Dahulu (The GRoove) & Soulmate (Kahitna)
Show 11 : Warna (Sheila Majid) & Maafkan (Rio Febrian) EXTRA APPEARANCE
Final SHow : Kaish Putih ( Glen Fredly ), Kau (Ello) & Why Do YOu LOve Me (Koesplus)

Discography

Albums
2007: Selalu Bersama
2010: Cuma Kamu Cuma Aku

References

External links
 Mytha Space

Living people
1991 births
Indonesian child singers
21st-century Indonesian women singers
Indonesian jazz singers
Indonesian pop singers
Javanese people
Mamamia show winners
People from Biak